Paul Scherrer (1890–1969) was a Swiss physicist.

Paul Scherrer may also refer to:

Paul Scherrer Institute (PSI), a multi-disciplinary research institute in Switzerland
Paul Scherrer (actor) (born 1968), American film and television actor
Paul Scherrer (politician) (1862–1935), President of the Swiss Council of States

Scherrer, Paul